Uwe Nepp (born 1 December 1966) is a German former cyclist. He competed in the team pursuit event at the 1988 Summer Olympics. Two years later, Nepp placed 21st at the 1990 Tour of Belgium.

References

External links
 

1966 births
Living people
German male cyclists
Olympic cyclists of West Germany
Cyclists at the 1988 Summer Olympics
Sportspeople from Krefeld
Cyclists from North Rhine-Westphalia